Jiří Beran (born 18 January 1982) is a Czech fencer. He competed in the men's épée event at the 2016 Summer Olympics.

References

External links
 

1982 births
Living people
Czech male fencers
Czech épée fencers
Olympic fencers of the Czech Republic
Fencers at the 2016 Summer Olympics
Place of birth missing (living people)